Brahmapurisvarar Temple is a Siva temple in Vilathotti in Mayiladuthurai district in Tamil Nadu (India).

Vaippu Sthalam
It is one of the shrines of the Vaippu Sthalams sung by Tamil Saivite Nayanar Appar.

Presiding deity
The presiding deity is known as Brahmapurisvarar. The Goddess is known as Itsurasanayaki.

Valarthottil
Now this place is known as Valarthottil and Vilathotti.

References

Hindu temples in Mayiladuthurai district
Shiva temples in Mayiladuthurai district